The International Society for Developmental Origins of Health and Disease (A International Society for DOHaD), a non-profit organization proposed by David Barker, was set up in 2003 and made up of various scientists and clinicians (31 main council members), whose main research concentration is the developmental origins of health and disease.

External links
Official Website of International Society for Developmental Origins of Health and Disease

International medical and health organizations